"Rip Her to Shreds" is a song by American new wave band Blondie, which features on the band's self-titled debut album.

Single information
"Rip Her To Shreds" was Blondie's first UK single, released on Chrysalis Records in the UK in late 1977, though it did not chart. The single peaked at No. 81 in Australia in March 1978. The B-sides to this single were "In the Flesh" and "X Offender", both previously issued as A-side singles by Private Stock Records, and both moderately successful in certain territories. As a promotional gimmick the song was also released as a 12" single (at that time a relative rarity), selling for 99p. 

In a BBC Radio documentary about Blondie, singer Debbie Harry said "Rip Her to Shreds" is about what gossip columns do to people's lives.

"Rip Her to Shreds" was included on Blondie's first greatest hits compilation The Best of Blondie, released in October 1981.

Two versions of the song are featured in the 2011 film Bridesmaids where the original studio version plays in the opening of the film and the live version plays during the end credits.

Blondie re-recorded the song for their 2014 compilation album Greatest Hits Deluxe Redux. The compilation was part of a 2-disc set called Blondie 4(0) Ever which included their 10th studio album Ghosts of Download and marked the 40th anniversary of the forming of the band.

Charts

Release history
UK 7", 12" (CHS 2180)
"Rip Her to Shreds" (Deborah Harry / Chris Stein) – 3:22
"In the Flesh" (Harry / Stein) – 2:33
"X Offender" (Harry / Gary Valentine) – 3:14

Covers
Pop duo Boomkat recorded a version of the song for 2004 film Mean Girls.

Notes

Blondie (band) songs
1977 singles
Songs written by Debbie Harry
Songs written by Chris Stein
Chrysalis Records singles
1976 songs